Dorothy Claire (born Marietta Wright, June 5, 1920 – September 4, 1982) was an American singer and radio personality.

Early years
The daughter of Mr. and Mrs. Nelson Wright, Claire was born in La Porte, Indiana on June 5, 1920. At age 4, she began singing, joining her sisters to form a trio that performed at parties and on WSBT radio in South Bend, Indiana. She later attended La Porte High School, where she was a cheerleader.

Career
Orchestra leader Ayars Lamar hired Claire as a singer when she was 16, changing her name from Marietta Wright to Dorothy Claire. Two of her sisters later adopted that last name for their own professional work. She debuted professionally when she appeared with Lamar's orchestra in Indianapolis at the Indiana Roof. She went on to sing for notable band leaders including Glenn Miller, Tommy Dorsey, Sonny Dunham, and Bob Crosby. Her rendition of "Perfidia" with Miller's orchestra sold more than 1 million records.

Breaking away from orchestras, Claire began singing in night clubs in Chicago, including Chez Paree and The Palmer House, then performed at the Copacabana in New York. She sang on Bing Crosby's radio program and on Don McNeill's Breakfast Club. She also had her own program on radio station WJZ in New York City and toured in vaudeville. Her work on television included appearances with Jack Carter and Paul Winchell.

On Broadway, Claire performed in Face the Music (1932), Finian's Rainbow (1947) and Jimmy (1969).

Later life and death
Claire returned to La Porte and resided there in the last few years of her life. She died there on September 4, 1982, at the age of 62. At the time of her death, Claire was legally known as Dorothy Carls, and was a widow.

References

External links 

1920 births
1982 deaths
20th-century American singers
20th-century American women singers
American women jazz singers
American jazz singers
Singers from Indiana
American radio personalities